HMCS Rosthern was a  that served in the Royal Canadian Navy during the Second World War. She served primarily in the Battle of the Atlantic as a convoy escort. She is named for Rosthern, Saskatchewan.

Background

Flower-class corvettes like Rosthern serving with the Royal Canadian Navy during the Second World War were different from earlier and more traditional sail-driven corvettes. The "corvette" designation was created by the French for classes of small warships; the Royal Navy borrowed the term for a period but discontinued its use in 1877. During the hurried preparations for war in the late 1930s, Winston Churchill reactivated the corvette class, needing a name for smaller ships used in an escort capacity, in this case based on a whaling ship design. The generic name "flower" was used to designate the class of these ships, which – in the Royal Navy – were named after flowering plants.

Corvettes commissioned by the Royal Canadian Navy during the Second World War were named after communities for the most part, to better represent the people who took part in building them. This idea was put forth by Admiral Percy W. Nelles. Sponsors were commonly associated with the community for which the ship was named. Royal Navy corvettes were designed as open sea escorts, while Canadian corvettes were developed for coastal auxiliary roles which was exemplified by their minesweeping gear. Eventually the Canadian corvettes would be modified to allow them to perform better on the open seas.

Construction
Rosthern was ordered 1 February 1940 as part of the 1939-1940 Flower-class building program. She was laid down on 18 June 1940 at Port Arthur Shipbuilding Co. in Port Arthur, Ontario and launched on 30 November 1940. She was commissioned into the RCN on 17 June 1941 at Montreal, Quebec.

Rosthern had only one significant refit during her career. After developing mechanical troubles in October 1941, she spent two months repairing on the river Clyde in the United Kingdom before being sent back to Halifax in December 1941 for further repairs. Rosthern was one of the few Flowers not to have her fo'c'sle extended.

War service
After arriving at Halifax for deployment, Rosthern initially joined Newfoundland Command, escorting convoys between St. John's and Iceland. She escorted her first convoy, leaving 7 October 1941, but developed mechanical defects on the way and was sent on to the Clyde for repairs. She did not return to service until February 1942. She would remain an ocean escort until June 1944.

In April 1942 she was made a member of the Mid-Ocean Escort Force (MOEF) escort group A-3. In May 1942, it was renumbered C-5. During her service with MOEF, Rosthern fought in three significant convoy battles; SC 100 in September 1942, ON 166 in February 1943, and SC 121 in March 1943. The corvettes sank the wrecked tanker with gunfire and depth charges. During the battle for Convoy ON 166, she picked up survivors from the Norwegian merchant Ingria and British merchant Manchester Merchant. During the battle for Convoy SC 121, Rosthern picked up three survivors from the British merchant Egyptian, which had been sunk.

In late May 1944, Rosthern returned to Canada to become a training ship for navigation and handling at Halifax. In December 1944, she was attached to the Western Local Escort Force as part of Halifax Force. She remained with this unit until the end of the war, her final significant duty was escorting  back to Canada.

Trans-Atlantic convoys escorted

Post war service
Rosthern was paid off 19 July 1945 at Sorel, Quebec. She was sold for scrap in June 1946 and broken up at Hamilton, Ontario.

References

Flower-class corvettes of the Royal Canadian Navy
1940 ships